Senya Beraku is a residential area in the Awutu Senya District of the Central Region of Ghana. Senya Beraku is the site of Fort Good Hope.

Populated places in the Central Region (Ghana)